During the 2004-05 season, SV Werder Bremen played in the Bundesliga, the highest tier of the German football league system.

Season summary
Werder Bremen never came close to retaining their Bundesliga title and finished 18 points behind champions Bayern Munich. This was still good enough for another season in the Champions League, albeit entering in the third qualifying round. The club also failed to retain its DFB-Pokal crown, being eliminated in the semi-finals by Schalke.

Players

First-team squad
Squad at end of season

Left club during season

Werder Bremen II

Youth team

References

Notes

Werder Bremen
2005